Kanti Rajya Lakshmi Devi Shah (5 July 1906 – 12 April 1973) was the Queen consort and first wife of Tribhuvan Bir Bikram Shah, King of Nepal. She was the mother of King Mahendra Bir Bikram Shah.

Life 
She was the daughter of Arjan Singh Sahib, Raja of Chhatara, Barhgaon and Oudh and his wife, Krishnavati Devi Sahiba.

She was married (at a young age in an arranged custom) at the Narayanhity Royal Palace, Kathmandu, in March 1919, to King Tribhuvan of Nepal as his first wife, in a double ceremony with her younger sister Ishwari, as his second wife.

Honours 
 Member of the Order of the Benevolent Ruler (1954).
 King Mahendra Coronation Medal (2 May 1956).

See also 
 Kanti Children's Hospital.

References

1906 births
1973 deaths
Nepalese queens consort
20th-century Nepalese nobility
Nepalese Hindus
Queen mothers